Elytracanthina propinqua is a species of beetle in the family Cerambycidae. It was described by Lane in 1959. It is known from Brazil.

References

Lamiinae
Beetles described in 1959